Hold Your Fire is a 2021 American documentary film written, directed, shot, edited, and produced by Stefan Forbes. It is about the 1973 New York City hostage incident in Brooklyn, New York, which helped birth modern hostage negotiation. The film premiered at the Toronto International Film Festival on September 10, 2021. It was released in theaters on May 20, 2022, by IFC Films.

Premise
The film centres on the actions of police psychologist Harvey Schlossberg during hostage incident which occurred on January 19, 1973, when four young African-American men stealing guns were cornered by the NYPD, and took a dozen hostages.

Screenings and awards
Hold Your Fire premiered at the 2021 Toronto International Film Festival.

It won the Metropolis Grand Jury Prize at the 2021 Doc NYC Film Festival.

It won the 2020 Library Of Congress Better Angels Grand Prize for historical film.

It was NPR's Documentary of the Week in November 2021.

Reception

Box office
In the United States and Canada, the film earned $3,041 from fourteen theaters in its opening weekend, and $612 from eight theaters in its second weekend.

Critical response
Manohla Dargis, writing for The New York Times, called the film "formally audacious."

Allan Hunter of ScreenDaily.com wrote:

“Hold Your Fire has all the ingredients of a Sidney Lumet film…as tense as any thriller from that period, the involving human stories and lasting impact of the events makes for an absorbing, gripping film with theatrical potential."

Frank Scheck of Hollywood Reporter praised it as a “fast-paced, suspenseful real-life thriller featuring an array of fascinating characters."

Tambay Obenson of Indiewire give it a grade A to “a searing look into a little-known moment in history with profound repercussions for how we understand policing today."

References

External links
  
 InterPositive Media
 Hold Your Fire
 Director Stefan Forbes interview on Variety

2021 films
2021 documentary films
Documentary films about crime in the United States
2020s English-language films
Films set in 1973
Films set in the 1970s